The Brussels Collision Convention (formally, the Convention for the Unification of Certain Rules of Law with respect to Collisions between Vessels) is a 1910 multilateral treaty that established the rules of legal liability that result from collisions between ships at sea.

Content
Three general rules of legal liability are established by the Convention:
If a collision occurs that is accidental or of uncertain cause, the damages are borne by the party that suffers them;
If a collision occurs that is the fault of a party, the party at fault is liable for the damages that were caused; and
If a collision occurs that is the fault of more than one party, the parties at fault are liable in proportion to the faults respectively committed. (If it is not possible to determine the proportional fault, the liability is apportioned equally between the parties at fault.)
The implementation of these rules abolished any pre-existing legal presumptions as to which party bore fault in maritime collisions.

Creation and ratification
The Convention was concluded at the Brussels Maritime Conference and signed by 24 states on 23 September 1910. It entered into force on 1 March 1913 and by the Second World War had been ratified by most of the major sea-faring nations. It remains in force for many states as the Convention that governs apportionment of fault in maritime collision cases. The states that signed the treaty but have not ratified it are the United States, Cuba, and Chile. The depositary of the Convention is the government of Belgium.

See also
International Regulations for Preventing Collisions at Sea

External links
Convention text
 Treaty status, official depositary information

1910 in Belgium
Admiralty law treaties
Liability treaties
Treaties concluded in 1910
Treaties entered into force in 1913
Treaties of the German Empire
Treaties of Austria-Hungary
Treaties of Belgium
Treaties of the French Third Republic
Treaties of the United Kingdom (1801–1922)
Treaties extended to British India
Treaties of the Irish Free State
Treaties of Mexico
Treaties of the Netherlands
Treaties of the Kingdom of Romania
Treaties of the Russian Empire
Treaties extended to New Zealand
Treaties of the Kingdom of Italy (1861–1946)
Treaties of Denmark
Treaties of Nicaragua
Treaties of the Portuguese First Republic
Treaties of the Kingdom of Greece
Treaties of Norway
Treaties of Sweden
Treaties of the First Brazilian Republic
Treaties of the Empire of Japan
Treaties extended to Canada
Treaties of Uruguay
Treaties of Argentina
Treaties of the Second Polish Republic
Treaties of the Free City of Danzig
Treaties of Finland
Treaties of Spain under the Restoration
Treaties of Australia
Treaties of the Kingdom of Yugoslavia
Treaties of Latvia
Treaties of the Kingdom of Egypt
Treaties of Haiti
Treaties of Switzerland
Treaties of Turkey
Treaties of Pahlavi Iran
Treaties of the Democratic Republic of the Congo (1964–1971)
Treaties of Paraguay
Treaties of Tonga
Treaties of Luxembourg
Treaties of Croatia
Treaties of Slovenia
Treaties of East Germany
Treaties of Antigua and Barbuda
Treaties of the Bahamas
Treaties of Barbados
Treaties of Belize
Treaties of Cyprus
Treaties of Dominica
Treaties of the Federation of Malaya
Treaties of Fiji
Treaties of the Gambia
Treaties of Ghana
Treaties of Grenada
Treaties of Guyana
Treaties of Jamaica
Treaties of Kenya
Treaties of Kiribati
Treaties of Malta
Treaties of Mauritius
Treaties of Nigeria
Treaties of Papua New Guinea
Treaties of Madagascar
Treaties of Saint Kitts and Nevis
Treaties of Saint Lucia
Treaties of Saint Vincent and the Grenadines
Treaties of the Solomon Islands
Treaties of Seychelles
Treaties of Sierra Leone
Treaties of Singapore
Treaties of the Somali Republic
Treaties of the Dominion of Ceylon
Treaties of Trinidad and Tobago
Treaties of Tuvalu
Treaties of the People's Republic of Angola
Treaties of Cape Verde
Treaties of Guinea-Bissau
Treaties of the People's Republic of Mozambique
Treaties of São Tomé and Príncipe
Treaties of East Timor
Treaties of the Kingdom of Libya
Treaties extended to Guernsey
Treaties extended to the Isle of Man
Treaties extended to Jersey
Treaties extended to Bermuda
Treaties extended to the Falkland Islands
Treaties extended to Gibraltar
Treaties extended to British Hong Kong
Treaties extended to the Turks and Caicos Islands
Treaties extended to the Cayman Islands
Treaties extended to Saint Helena, Ascension and Tristan da Cunha
Treaties extended to Weihaiwei
Treaties extended to the British Leeward Islands
Treaties extended to the British Windward Islands
Treaties extended to the Colony of the Bahamas
Treaties extended to British Honduras
Treaties extended to British Cyprus
Treaties extended to British Dominica
Treaties extended to the Federated Malay States
Treaties extended to the Colony of Fiji
Treaties extended to the Gambia Colony and Protectorate
Treaties extended to the Gold Coast (British colony)
Treaties extended to British Guiana
Treaties extended to the Colony of Jamaica
Treaties extended to the East Africa Protectorate
Treaties extended to the Gilbert and Ellice Islands
Treaties extended to the Crown Colony of Malta
Treaties extended to British Mauritius
Treaties extended to the Southern Nigeria Protectorate
Treaties extended to the Territory of Papua
Treaties extended to French Madagascar
Treaties extended to the British Solomon Islands
Treaties extended to the Crown Colony of Seychelles
Treaties extended to the Colony of Sierra Leone
Treaties extended to the Straits Settlements
Treaties extended to British Somaliland
Treaties extended to British Ceylon
Treaties extended to the Crown Colony of Trinidad and Tobago
Treaties extended to Portuguese Macau
Treaties extended to the Dominion of Newfoundland
Treaties extended to Portuguese Angola
Treaties extended to Portuguese Cape Verde
Treaties extended to Portuguese India
Treaties extended to Portuguese Guinea
Treaties extended to Portuguese Mozambique
Treaties extended to Portuguese São Tomé and Príncipe
Treaties extended to Portuguese Timor
Treaties extended to Norfolk Island
Treaties extended to Italian Libya
Treaties extended to Italian Somaliland
Treaties extended to the Kingdom of Tonga (1900–1970)
Treaties extended to the Faroe Islands
Treaties extended to Greenland